Kwabena Adusei (born 3 June 1987) is a Ghanaian professional footballer who currently plays for Mpumalanga Black Aces in the Premier Soccer League.

Career
Kwabena Adusei has played for several Ghanaian teams including Asante Kotoko as a defender. On 30 May 2014, it was announced that he joined the South African top-flight side Mpumalanga Black Aces, along with Zimbabwean midfielder Peter Moyo. The centre-back however vehemently denied knowledge of the club in an interview with Footy-Ghana.com hours later. The South African club later had to pull their claim off their official website. Adusei is currently under contract with Ghanaian Champions Asante Kotoko SC. In August 2014 he signed with Mpumalanga Black Aces.

International career
In November 2013, coach Maxwell Konadu invited him to be a part of the Ghana squad for the 2013 WAFU Nations Cup. He helped the team to a first-place finish after Ghana beat Senegal by three goals to one.

International goals
Scores and results list Ghana's goal tally first.

Honours

Club
Asante Kotoko
Ghanaian Premier League: 2012–13

References

External links

Ghanaian footballers
Living people
Ghana international footballers
Ghanaian expatriate footballers
Medeama SC players
Asante Kotoko S.C. players
Mpumalanga Black Aces F.C. players
Expatriate soccer players in South Africa
WAFU Nations Cup players
Ghana A' international footballers
2014 African Nations Championship players
1987 births
Association football defenders